Châlons Cathedral is a Roman Catholic church in Châlons-en-Champagne, France, formerly known as Châlons-sur-Marne.

The cathedral is the seat of the Bishop of Châlons and was consecrated in 1147 October 26, by Pope Eugene III.

Jean-Jacques Arveuf-Fransquin designed the neo-Flamboyant organ case of Châlons Cathedral. The case was created by the cabinetmaker Etienne Gabriel Ventadour, and housed the instrument made by John Abbey, who delivered the instrument in 1849.
The cathedral is also noted for its stained glass windows.

See also
List of Gothic Cathedrals in Europe

References

Books

 [stained glass]

Sources

 Catholic Hierarchy: Diocese of Châlons
 Catholic Encyclopedia: Châlons-sur-Marne
 Unofficial Cathedral website

Roman Catholic cathedrals in France
Churches in Marne (department)